Starting position for Ünee tugalluulakh.

Ünee tugalluulakh (let the cows calve) is a mancala game played by Kazakhs in western Mongolia. The rules are the same as the iesön khorgol game.

References

External links 
Rules to Unee tugaluulax posted on the manqala.org wiki.

Traditional mancala games
Mongolian games